Dans les yeux d'Émilie is a song by Joe Dassin from his 1978 album Les Femmes de ma vie. It was also released as a single in 1977, with "Maria" on the other side.

Writing and composition 
The song was written by Pierre Delanoë and Claude Lemesle and composed by Yvon Ouazana and Vivien Vallay.

In this song Joe Dassin sings about winter in Quebec.

2015 EuroBasket 
The song was the official song of the French basketball team at the 2015 European Basketball Championship (EuroBasket).

Track listing 
7" single CBS 5928
 "Dans les yeux d'Émilie" (3:40)
 "Maria" (4:40)

Cover versions 
 2013: Bart Kaëll (in Dutch under the title "Zonneschijn")
 2013: Hélène Ségara with Joe Dassin on the album Et si tu n'existais pas
 2015: Joe Dassin, Les Choeurs de l'Armée Rouge (Joe Dassin with the Red Army Choir on the album Joe Dassin chante avec les Chœurs de l'Armée Rouge

References

External links 
 Joe Dassin – "Dans les yeux d'Émilie / Maria" at Discogs

1977 songs
1977 singles
Joe Dassin songs
French songs
CBS Disques singles
Songs written by Pierre Delanoë
Songs written by Claude Lemesle
Song recordings produced by Jacques Plait